"Soon Be Done" is a song by Jamaican reggae artist Shaggy, released as the third single from his first studio album, Pure Pleasure (1993).

Background
The single was released in June 1993. A music video for the song was premiered in September 1993 and, in 2009, was made available via Shaggy's official VEVO account. The music video shows Shaggy performing the song in an underground setting. The single peaked at #39 on the UK Singles Chart, six places higher than "Nice and Lovely". It was only released in the United Kingdom and Europe.

Critical reception
Alan Jones from Music Week gave the song four out of five. He added, "More traditional fare from Shaggy, whose gruff patois is anchored to an understated rhythm track. Less of a killer than Oh Carolina, but another substantial, good humoured hit." Sylvia Patterson of Smash Hits was less enthustiastic, rating it two out of five and calling it a "daft ragga nursery rhyme".

Track listings
 CD, cassette, and 7-inch vinyl
 "Soon Be Done" - 3:37
 "Soon Be Done" (Champion Mix) - 3:43

 Maxi-CD
 "Soon Be Done" - 3:37
 "Soon Be Done" (Dancehall Lick) - 6:05
 "Soon Be Done" (Champion Mix) - 3:43
 "Ah-E-A-Oh" (featuring Sylva) – 3:15

 12-inch vinyl
 "Soon Be Done" - 3:37
 "Soon Be Done" (Dancehall Lick) - 6:05
 "Ah-E-A-Oh" (featuring Sylva) – 3:15
 "Ah-E-A-Oh" (featuring Sylva) (Alternate Version)

Charts

Weekly charts

Year-end charts

Certifications

References

Shaggy (musician) songs
1993 singles
1993 songs
Songs written by Shaggy (musician)
Virgin Records singles